Menno Koch (born 2 July 1994) is a Dutch professional footballer who plays as a centre-back for CSKA Sofia. Besides the Netherlands, he has played in Belgium.

Career
Koch was born in Heeze. He made his professional debut as Jong PSV player in the Eerste Divisie on 3 August 2013 against Sparta Rotterdam. He scored the 2–2 equalizer with his head in the 76th minute.
On 25 February 2021, Koch signed a 3.5-year contract with CSKA Sofia.

Career statistics

Club

Honours
CSKA Sofia
 Bulgarian Cup: 2020–21

References

External links
 
 Voetbal International profile 
 

Living people
1994 births
Sportspeople from Heeze-Leende
Association football central defenders
Dutch footballers
Netherlands youth international footballers
Eredivisie players
Eerste Divisie players
PSV Eindhoven players
NAC Breda players
FC Utrecht players
K.A.S. Eupen players
PFC CSKA Sofia players
First Professional Football League (Bulgaria) players
Belgian Pro League players
Dutch expatriate footballers
Dutch expatriate sportspeople in Belgium
Expatriate footballers in Belgium
Footballers from North Brabant
Dutch expatriate sportspeople in Bulgaria
Expatriate footballers in Bulgaria